Felinos 48 is a Mexican football club that plays in Group 1 in the Tercera División de México. The club is based in Reforma, Chiapas, Mexico.

The team's logo indicates that its origins are with the Sindicato de Trabajadores Petroleros de la República Mexicana, S.T.P.R.M, and its name "de la 48," means that the team was formed from S.T.P.R.M.'s "Section 48" which is in Reforma, Chiapas.

The team was originally named Jaguares de la 48, being an affiliated squad of Jaguares de Chiapas, however, in 2017 the parent club was expelled from Mexican soccer and the team was renamed as Felinos 48.

See also
Football in Mexico

Football clubs in Chiapas
2006 establishments in Mexico